Innocent Blood (also known in some regions as A French Vampire in America) is a 1992 American black comedy horror film directed by John Landis and written by Michael Wolk. The film stars Anne Parillaud as a beautiful French vampire who finds herself pitted against a gang of mobsters led by Salvatore Macelli (Robert Loggia) who eventually becomes a vampire and schemes to build a criminal syndicate of vampires.

The film is set and was filmed around Pittsburgh, Pennsylvania. The "Little Italy" of Pittsburgh, a portion of the Bloomfield, Pittsburgh neighborhood, clustered around Liberty Avenue, is recognizable in many of the film's outdoor urban scenes. Actors Tony Sirico and David Proval have supporting parts as gangsters, foreshadowing their roles in The Sopranos. It also features early appearances by Anthony LaPaglia, Angela Bassett, and Chazz Palminteri. The film is notable for being a mixture of the vampire, gangster and buddy cop genres. The film was a box-office bomb, earning only $5 million over its $20 million budget.

Plot
Marie is a vampire in modern Pittsburgh, with a moral code that limits her bloodsucking to the criminal elements of society. After feasting on mafioso Tony Silva, she shoots him in the head with a shotgun to cover up the bite marks on his neck and to prevent him from coming back as a vampire. Undercover cop Joseph Gennaro visits the crime scene but is taken off his assignment of infiltrating the crime family of Salvatore "Sal the Shark" Macelli and put into protective custody by District Attorney Sinclair for being seen at the crime scene by the media.

The next night, Marie seduces Sal, who takes her back to his mansion for "dinner". She is warded off when Sal serves garlic mussels, and she tries to escape through the bathroom window but finds it barred up. Sal attempts to rape her but Marie overpowers him and drains his blood. Before she can finish him off, Sal's limousine driver, Lenny intervenes and she is forced to flee. Gennaro investigates the scene and follows a trail of blood to a nearby church, where he finds and chases Marie. When Gennaro gets back to his car, Marie finds him and demands that he drive her to the morgue where Sal was taken. Sal, now a vampire, awakens in the morgue and steals a car to drive to the home of his attorney, Manny Bergman, being seen by police and reporters in his escape.

Outside the morgue, Gennaro leaves Marie with his colleagues Detectives Dave Finton and Steve Morales and goes to Bergman's house to pursue Sal. Marie escapes from custody and follows him. At Bergman's home, Sal drinks Bergman's blood and Gennaro is captured by Lenny and Jacko. The three mobsters take Gennaro to the docks and attempt to kill him using the compactor of a garbage truck. Marie arrives, saves him and kills Sal's men but Sal manages to escape. Gennaro and Marie attempt to pursue him but the sun rises and Marie has to retreat into a motel. Sal hides in a meat factory that he owns. Bergman is transferred to a hospital but after becoming a vampire, he is burned alive when a nurse opens the window and lets the sunlight in. In the motel, Gennaro and Marie confess their feelings for each other and have sex.

The next night, Sal travels to a strip club that he owns and begins turning his men into vampires like him. Gennaro and Marie begin searching Mafia hangouts for Sal. Finton and Morales track him down to the strip club but Sal's men kill Finton. Marie and Gennaro arrive in time to save Morales and kill Sal's men by shooting them in the head. They chase Sal out onto the street, where he causes a collision between a taxi and a bus. Gennaro kills him by igniting him with the leaking gas tank of the bus and then shooting him in the head. Marie can no longer handle being the monster she is, and attempts to commit suicide by the sunlight, stating that she "died a long time ago". Gennaro talks her out of it, telling her that he loves her. Gennaro books her into a nearby hotel and Marie states in a voiceover that he "made [her] feel alive" and decides to make him a vampire.

Cast

 Anne Parillaud as Marie
 Robert Loggia as Salvatore "Sal the Shark" Macelli
 Anthony LaPaglia as Detective Joseph Gennaro
 Don Rickles as Manny Bergman
 Elaine Kagan as Frannie Bergman
 David Proval as Lenny
 Rocco Sisto as Gilly
 Chazz Palminteri as Tony Silva
 Kim Coates as Ray
 Marshall Bell as Detective Marsh
 Linnea Quigley as Nurse Nancy Smith
 Tony Sirico as Jacko
 Tony Lip as Frank
 Luis Guzmán as Detective Steve Morales
 Angela Bassett as U.S. Attorney Barbara Sinclair
 Leo Burmester as Detective Dave Finton
 Rohn Thomas as Coroner
 Frank Oz as Pathologist
 Tom Savini as News Photographer
 Sam Raimi as Roma Meats Man
 Forrest J. Ackerman as Stolen Car Man
 Dario Argento as Paramedic
 Yancey Arias as Coroner's assistant
 Ron Roth as Gus
 Vic Noto as Tommy
 Jerry Lyden as Vinnie

Production
The film began as a script by Mick and Richard Christian Matheson called Red Sleep. John Landis had a deal at Warner Bros. to make it. He wrote it with Harry Shearer and "it was pretty wild," said Landis. "The premise was basically that Las Vegas is a city that is run by vampires." They turned it into the studio, who did not like it. Then they offered another vampire script, Innocent Blood by Michael Wolk. Landis said "I really liked it. I was given tremendous freedom by the studio to make it, although it was rather low budget. It was very risky, which I think perhaps contributed to the fact that it didn’t do well."

Landis cast Anne Parillaud off the back of La Femme Nikita "because Marie had to be beautiful and sexy and very sympathetic. Anne had been a ballerina, so she had this amazing physicality." Landis said preview audiences had trouble understanding her French accent but he refused to dub her. Landis said he described the film as "a Hammer film as if it was directed by Scorsese". The film was shot in Pittsburgh, beginning on January 13, 1992; Landis originally intended to set the film in New York and shoot most of it in Philadelphia for New York but when he saw Pittsburgh, he decided to film there. Filming wrapped on April 7, 1992. Landis previewed the film, then made about 15–20 minutes of cuts based on the preview and handed in the cut. The MPAA wanted to give the film an NC-17 rating so two more minutes were cut out to get an R.

Release

Box office
Innocent Blood opened on September 25, 1992, and grossed $1,857,658 in its opening weekend, earning the #7 spot at the box office. By the end of its run, the film had grossed $4,943,279 domestically.

Home media
Several versions were released for home viewing, which were generally cut to some extent, censored for nudity and gore. The US (region 1) DVD release is the shortest, and is also in pan and scan 4:3 ratio, whereas the original film was widescreen. The most complete DVD version is the German release, entitled Bloody Marie: Eine Frau Mit Biss which is 28 seconds longer and in widescreen format. The widescreen version was eventually released on Blu-ray by Warner Archive Collection on September 19, 2017.
HMV Store's have released it on Blu-Ray on their Premium Collection label (May 2020) in the UK with four art cards & fold out poster.

Critical reception
The film received mixed reviews from critics. On Rotten Tomatoes, it currently holds a 38% score based on 24 reviews, with an average rating of 5/10. The site's consensus reads, "Awkward tonal shifts and a sluggish pace plague Innocent Blood -- a horror comedy with anemic scares and laughs".

See also
 Vampire film

References

External links
 
 
 
 

1992 films
1992 crime films
1992 horror films
1992 romantic comedy films
1990s black comedy films
1990s comedy horror films
1990s crime comedy films
1990s English-language films
1990s vigilante films
American black comedy films
American comedy horror films
American crime comedy films
American romantic comedy films
American romantic horror films
American splatter films
American vampire films
American vigilante films
Crime horror films
Films directed by John Landis
Films scored by Ira Newborn
Films set in Pittsburgh
Films shot in Los Angeles County, California
Films shot in Pennsylvania
Mafia comedy films
Vampire comedy films
Warner Bros. films
1990s American films